Nizam Uddin Khan is a Bangladesh Nationalist Party politician and the former Member of Parliament of Dhaka-3 and Manikganj-3.

Career
Khan was elected to parliament from Dhaka-3 as a Bangladesh Nationalist Party candidate in 1979. He was elected to parliament from Manikganj-3 as a Bangladesh Nationalist Party candidate in 1991, February 1996 and 12 June 1996.

References

Bangladesh Nationalist Party politicians
1996 deaths
5th Jatiya Sangsad members
Year of birth missing
2nd Jatiya Sangsad members
6th Jatiya Sangsad members
7th Jatiya Sangsad members